Melrose is an unincorporated community in Stone County, Arkansas, United States. The Walter Gray House, which is listed on the National Register of Historic Places, is located in Melrose.

References

Unincorporated communities in Stone County, Arkansas
Unincorporated communities in Arkansas